Hannah Martin (born June 27, 1988) is an American judoka.

She is the silver medallist of the 2017 Judo Grand Prix Tashkent in the -63 kg category.

References

External links

 

1988 births
Living people
American male judoka
21st-century American people
Pan American Games medalists in judo
Pan American Games bronze medalists for the United States
Judoka at the 2019 Pan American Games
Medalists at the 2019 Pan American Games